Lead Creek is a stream in Lincoln County in the U.S. state of Missouri. It is a tributary of Cuivre River.

Indians were said to have conducted small-scale lead mining in the area, hence the name.

See also
List of rivers of Missouri

References

Rivers of Lincoln County, Missouri
Rivers of Missouri